Kuduz is a 1989 film, set in SR Bosnia and Herzegovina written by Abdulah Sidran and Ademir Kenović, who also directed the film. It is based on the true story of the outlaw Junuz Kečo.

Plot 
A petty criminal is released from prison and marries his girlfriend.  He manages to live a life free from crime, poor but happy, until his new wife commits adultery, which leads him to murder her and her lover.  He then escapes into the mountains and evades justice for years.

This is a story about love and tragedy. It takes place in the grim social setting of city outskirts. Badema, a seductive local girl, meets Bećir Kuduz who has just come out of prison. Neither the age difference nor fact that Badema has a little girl of her own (without knowing who the father is) stops them from coming together, each with plans of their own. Kuduz dreams of starting up his own construction business, Badema wants to work in a local cafe where it is fun and never boring. 

But Badema is obviously quite light-hearted and is no homebody. Kuduz, meanwhile, is a man plagued by tragedy, torn by love, passion and jealousy. The two squabble and make up, then fight and split up only to return, and so the story unfolds until it reaches its inevitable tragic end. And it would all be utterly banal and unimportant were it not for fact that behind this tragedy lies the pure, true love of two people who find each other in this cruel world: Kuduz and Badema's five-year-old daughter Amela.

Cast
 Slobodan Ćustić as Bećir Kuduz
 Snežana Bogdanović as Badema Kuduz
 Božidar Bunjevac as Salem Pilav
 Branko Đurić as Alija Goro
 Mustafa Nadarević as Police officer Šemso
 Ivana Legin as Amela, Badema's daughter
 Radmila Živković as Anđa
 Boro Stjepanović as Rudo
 Sena Mustajbašić
 Saša Petrović
 Amina Begović		
 Haris Burina
 Zaim Muzaferija
 Ines Fančović (credited as Ines Fančević)

External links 
 
 Kuduz at Bosnian WikiQuote

1989 films
Bosnia and Herzegovina drama films
Films scored by Goran Bregović
Yugoslav drama films